The table below summarizes results of elections to the United States House of Representatives from 1824 to 1854, a period corresponding to the Second Party System. In the House of Representatives, "Independent Democrats" and "Independent Whigs" are counted with the Democrats and the Whigs, respectively, and as described in the accompanying 'Note'. For more detailed results, see the main page for that election. Parties with a House majority or a plurality are shown in bold.


See also
 List of United States House of Representatives elections (1789–1822)
 List of United States House of Representatives elections (1856–present)
 Second Party System

Notes

Bibliography

External links
 History, Art & Archives United States House of Representatives

1824-1854
House of Representatives elections, 1824-1854